Chronic pain is classified as pain that lasts longer than three to six months. In medicine, the distinction between acute and chronic pain is sometimes determined by the amount of time since onset. Two commonly used markers are pain that continues at three months and six months since onset, but some theorists and researchers have placed the transition from acute to chronic pain at twelve months. Others apply the term acute to pain that lasts less than 30 days, chronic to pain of more than six months duration, and subacute to pain that lasts from one to six months. A popular alternative definition of chronic pain, involving no fixed duration, is "pain that extends beyond the expected period of healing".

Chronic pain may originate in the body, or in the brain or spinal cord. It is often difficult to treat. Epidemiological studies have found that 8–11.2% of people in various countries have chronic widespread pain. Various non-opioid medicines are initially recommended to treat chronic pain, depending on whether the pain is due to tissue damage or is neuropathic.  Psychological treatments including cognitive behavioral therapy and acceptance and commitment therapy may be effective for improving quality of life in those with chronic pain. Some people with chronic pain may benefit from opioid treatment while others can be harmed by it. People with non-cancer pain who have not been helped by non-opioid medicines might be recommended to try opioids if there is no history of substance use disorder and no current mental illness.

People with chronic pain tend to have higher rates of depression and although the exact connection between the comorbidities is unclear, a 2017 study on neuroplasticity found that "injury sensory pathways of body pains have been shown to share the same brain regions involved in mood management."  Chronic pain can contribute to decreased physical activity due to fear of making the pain worse. Pain intensity, pain control, and resilience to pain can be influenced by different levels and types of social support that a person with chronic pain receives, and are also influenced by the person's socioeconomic status.
One approach to predicting a person's experience of chronic pain is the biopsychosocial model, according to which an individual's experience of chronic pain may be affected by a complex mixture of their biology, psychology, and their social environment.

Classification

The International Association for the Study of Pain defines chronic pain as pain with no biological value, that persists past normal tissue healing.  The DSM-5 recognizes one chronic pain disorder, somatic symptom disorders. The criteria include pain lasting longer than six months.

The International Classification of Disease, Eleventh Revision (ICD-11) suggests seven categories for chronic pain.
 Chronic primary pain: defined by 3 months of persistent pain in one or more regions of the body that is unexplainable by another pain condition.
 Chronic cancer pain: defined as cancer or treatment related visceral (within the internal organs), musculoskeletal, or bony pain.
 Chronic post-traumatic pain: pain lasting 3 months after an injury or surgery, excluding infectious or pre-existing conditions.
 Chronic neuropathic pain: pain caused by damage to the somatosensory nervous system.
 Chronic headache and orofacial pain: pain that originates in the head or face, and occurs for 50% or more days over a 3 months period.
 Chronic visceral pain: pain originating in an internal organ.
 Chronic musculoskeletal pain: pain originating in the bones, muscles, joints or connective tissue.

Chronic pain may be divided into "nociceptive" (caused by inflamed or damaged tissue activating specialized pain sensors called nociceptors), and "neuropathic" (caused by damage to or malfunction of the nervous system).

Nociceptive pain can be divided into "superficial" and "deep", and deep pain into "deep somatic" and "visceral". Superficial pain is initiated by activation of nociceptors in the skin or superficial tissues. Deep somatic pain is initiated by stimulation of nociceptors in ligaments, tendons, bones, blood vessels, fasciae and muscles, and is dull, aching, poorly-localized pain. Visceral pain originates in the viscera (organs). Visceral pain may be well-localized, but often it is extremely difficult to locate, and several visceral regions produce "referred" pain when damaged or inflamed, where the sensation is located in an area distant from the site of pathology or injury.

Neuropathic pain is divided into "peripheral" (originating in the peripheral nervous system) and "central" (originating in the brain or spinal cord). Peripheral neuropathic pain is often described as "burning", "tingling", "electrical", "stabbing", or "pins and needles".

Causes

Pathophysiology
Under persistent activation, the transmission of pain signals to the dorsal horn may produce a pain wind-up phenomenon. This triggers changes that lower the threshold for pain signals to be transmitted. In addition, it may cause nonnociceptive nerve fibers to respond to, generate, and transmit pain signals. The type of nerve fibers that are believed to generate the pain signals are the C-fibers, since they have a slow conductivity and give rise to a painful sensation that persists over a long time. In chronic pain, this process is difficult to reverse or stop once established. In some cases, chronic pain can be caused by genetic factors which interfere with neuronal differentiation, leading to a permanently lowered threshold for pain.

Chronic pain of different causes has been characterized as a disease that affects brain structure and function. MRI studies have shown abnormal anatomical and functional connectivity, even during rest involving areas related to the processing of pain. Also, persistent pain has been shown to cause grey matter loss, which is reversible once the pain has resolved.

These structural changes can be explained by neuroplasticity. In the case of chronic pain, the somatotopic representation of the body is inappropriately reorganized following peripheral and central sensitization. This can cause allodynia or hyperalgesia. In individuals with chronic pain, EEGs showed altered brain activity, suggesting pain-induced neuroplastic changes. More specifically, the relative beta activity (compared to the rest of the brain) was increased, the relative alpha activity was decreased, and the theta activity was diminished.

Dysfunctional dopamine management in the brain could potentially act as a shared mechanism between chronic pain, insomnia and major depressive disorder. Astrocytes, microglia, and satellite glial cells have also been found to be dysfunctional in chronic pain.  Increased activity of microglia, alterations of microglial networks, and increased production of chemokines and cytokines by microglia might aggravate chronic pain.  Astrocytes have been observed to lose their ability to regulate the excitability of neurons, increasing spontaneous neural activity in pain circuits.

Management

Pain management is a branch of medicine that uses an interdisciplinary approach. The combined knowledge of various medical professions and allied health professions is used to ease pain and improve the quality of life of those living with pain. The typical pain management team includes medical practitioners (particularly anesthesiologists), rehabilitation psychologists, physiotherapists, occupational therapists, physician assistants, and nurse practitioners. Acute pain usually resolves with the efforts of one practitioner; however, the management of chronic pain frequently requires the coordinated efforts of a treatment team. Complete, longterm remission of many types of chronic pain is rare.

Nonopioids
Initially recommended efforts are non opioid based therapies. Non-opioid treatment of chronic pain with pharmaceutical medicines might include acetaminophen (paracetamol) or NSAIDs.

Various other nonopioid medicines can be used, depending on whether the pain is a result of tissue damage or is neuropathic (pain caused by a damaged or dysfunctional nervous system). There is limited evidence that cancer pain or chronic pain from tissue damage as a result of a conditions (e.g. rheumatoid arthritis) is best treated with opioids. For neuropathic pain other drugs may be more effective than opioids, such as tricyclic antidepressants, serotonin-norepinephrine reuptake inhibitors, and anticonvulsants. Some atypical antipsychotics, such as olanzapine, may also be effective, but the evidence to support this is in very early stages. In women with chronic pain, hormonal medications such as oral contraceptive pills ("the pill") might be helpful. When there is no evidence of a single best fit, doctors may need to look for a treatment that works for the individual person. It is difficult for doctors to predict who will use opioids just for pain management and who will go on to develop an addiction. It is also challenging for doctors to know which patients ask for opioids because they are living with an opioid addiction. Withholding, interrupting or withdrawing opioid treatment in people who benefit from it can cause harm.

Interventional pain management may be appropriate, including techniques such as trigger point injections, neurolytic blocks, and radiotherapy. While there is no high quality evidence to support ultrasound, it has been found to have a small effect on improving function in non-specific chronic low back pain.

Psychological treatments, including cognitive behavioral therapy and acceptance and commitment therapy can be helpful for improving quality of life and reducing pain interference. Brief mindfulness-based treatment approaches have been used, but they are not yet recommended as a first-line treatment. The effectiveness of mindfulness-based pain management (MBPM) has been supported by a range of studies.

Among older adults psychological interventions can help reduce pain and improve self-efficacy for pain management. Psychological treatments have also been shown to be effective in children and teens with chronic headache or mixed chronic pain conditions.

While exercise has been offered as a method to lessen chronic pain and there is some evidence of benefit, this evidence is tentative. For people living with chronic pain, exercise results in few side effects.

Opioids
In those who have not benefited from other measures and have no history of either mental illness or substance use disorder treatment with opioids may be tried. If significant benefit does not occur it is recommended that they be stopped. In those on opioids, stopping or decreasing their use may improve outcomes including pain.

Some people with chronic pain benefit from opioid treatment and others do not; some are harmed by the treatment. Possible harms include reduced sex hormone production, hypogonadism, infertility, impaired immune system, falls and fractures in older adults, neonatal abstinence syndrome, heart problems, sleep-disordered breathing, opioid-induced hyperalgesia, physical dependence, addiction, abuse, and overdose.

Alternative medicine
Alternative medicine refers to health practices or products that are used to treat pain or illness that are not necessarily considered a part of conventional medicine. When dealing with chronic pain, these practices generally fall into the following four categories: biological, mind-body, manipulative body, and energy medicine.

Implementing dietary changes, which is considered a biological-based alternative medicine practice, has been shown to help improve symptoms of chronic pain over time. Adding supplements to one's diet is a common dietary change when trying to relieve chronic pain, with some of the most studied supplements being: Acetyl-L-carnitine, alpha lipoic acid, and vitamin E. Vitamin E is perhaps the most studied out of the three, with strong evidence that it helps lower neurotoxicity in those with cancer, multiple sclerosis, and cardiovascular diseases.

Hypnosis, including self-hypnosis, has tentative evidence. Hypnosis, specifically, can offer pain relief for most people and may be a safe alternative to pharmaceutical medication. Evidence does not support hypnosis for chronic pain due to a spinal cord injury.

Preliminary studies have found medical marijuana to be beneficial in treating neuropathic pain, but not other kinds of long term pain. , the evidence for its efficacy in treating neuropathic pain or pain associated with rheumatic diseases is not strong for any benefit and further research is needed. For chronic non-cancer pain, a recent study concluded that it is unlikely that cannabinoids are highly effective. However, more rigorous research into cannabis or cannabis-based medicines is needed.

Tai chi has been shown to improve pain, stiffness, and quality of life in chronic conditions such as osteoarthritis, low back pain, and osteoporosis. Acupuncture has also been found to be an effective and safe treatment in reducing pain and improving quality of life in chronic pain including chronic pelvic pain syndrome.

Transcranial magnetic stimulation for reduction of chronic pain is not supported by high quality evidence, and the demonstrated effects are small and short-term.

Spa therapy could potentially improve pain in patients with chronic lower back pain, but more studies are needed to provide stronger evidence of this.

While some studies have investigated the efficacy of St John's Wort or nutmeg for treating neuropathic (nerve) pain, their findings have raised serious concerns about the accuracy of their results.

Kinesio Tape has not been shown to be effective in managing chronic non-specific low-back pain.

Myofascial release has been used in some cases of fibromyalgia, chronic low back pain, and tennis elbow but there is not enough evidence to support this as method of treatment.

Epidemiology
Chronic pain varies in different countries affecting anywhere from 8% to 55% of the population. It affects women at a higher rate than men, and chronic pain uses a large amount of healthcare resources around the globe.

A large-scale telephone survey of 15 European countries and Israel found that 19% of respondents over 18 years of age had suffered pain for more than 6 months, including the last month, and more than twice in the last week, with pain intensity of 5 or more for the last episode, on a scale of 1 (no pain) to 10 (worst imaginable). 4839 of these respondents with chronic pain were interviewed in-depth. Sixty-six percent scored their pain intensity at moderate (5–7), and 34% at severe (8–10); 46% had constant pain, 56% intermittent; 49% had suffered pain for 2–15 years; and 21% had been diagnosed with depression due to the pain. Sixty-one percent were unable or less able to work outside the home, 19% had lost a job, and 13% had changed jobs due to their pain. Forty percent had inadequate pain management and less than 2% were seeing a pain management specialist.

In the United States, chronic pain has been estimated to occur in approximately 35% of the population, with approximately 50 million Americans experiencing partial or total disability as a consequence. According to the Institute of Medicine, there are about 116 million Americans living with chronic pain, which suggests that approximately half of American adults have some chronic pain condition. The Mayday Fund estimate of 70 million Americans with chronic pain is slightly more conservative. In an internet study, the prevalence of chronic pain in the United States was calculated to be 30.7% of the population: 34.3% for women and 26.7% for men.

In Canada it is estimated that approximately 1 in 5 Canadians live with chronic pain and half of those people have lived with chronic pain for 10 years or longer. Chronic pain in Canada also occurs more and is more severe in women and Canada's Indigenous communities.

Outcomes
Sleep disturbance, and insomnia due to medication and illness symptoms are often experienced by those with chronic pain. These conditions can be difficult to treat due to the high potential of medication interactions, especially when the conditions are treated by different doctors.

Severe chronic pain is associated with increased risk of death over a ten-year period, particularly from heart disease and respiratory disease. Several mechanisms have been proposed for this increase, such as an abnormal stress response in the body's endocrine system. Additionally, chronic stress seems to affect risks to heart and lung (cardiovascular) health by increasing how quickly plaque can build up on artery walls (arteriosclerosis). However, further research is needed to clarify the relationship between severe chronic pain, stress and cardiovascular health.

Psychology

Personality
Two of the most frequent personality profiles found in people with chronic pain by the Minnesota Multiphasic Personality Inventory (MMPI) are the conversion V and the neurotic triad. The conversion V personality expresses exaggerated concern over body feelings, develops bodily symptoms in response to stress, and often fails to recognize their own emotional state, including depression. The neurotic triad personality also expresses exaggerated concern over body feelings and develops bodily symptoms in response to stress, but is demanding and complaining.

Some investigators have argued that it is this neuroticism that causes acute pain to turn chronic, but clinical evidence points the other way, to chronic pain causing neuroticism. When long term pain is relieved by therapeutic intervention, scores on the neurotic triad and anxiety fall, often to normal levels. Self-esteem, often low in people with chronic pain, also shows improvement once pain has resolved.

It has been suggested that catastrophizing might play a role in the experience of pain. Pain catastrophizing is the tendency to describe a pain experience in more exaggerated terms than the average person, to think a great deal more about the pain when it occurs, or to feel more helpless about the experience. People who score highly on measures of catastrophization are likely to rate a pain experience as more intense than those who score low on such measures. It is often reasoned that the tendency to catastrophize causes the person to experience the pain as more intense. One suggestion is that catastrophizing influences pain perception through altering attention and anticipation, and heightening emotional responses to pain. However, at least some aspects of catastrophization may be the product of an intense pain experience, rather than its cause. That is, the more intense the pain feels to the person, the more likely they are to have thoughts about it that fit the definition of catastrophization.

Comorbidity with trauma 
Individuals with posttraumatic stress disorder (PTSD) have a high comorbidity with chronic pain. Patients with both PTSD and chronic pain report higher severity of pain than those who do not have a PTSD comorbidity.

Effect on cognition
Chronic pain's impact on cognition is an under-researched area, but several tentative conclusions have been published. Most people with chronic pain complain of cognitive impairment, such as forgetfulness, difficulty with attention, and difficulty completing tasks. Objective testing has found that people in chronic pain tend to experience impairment in attention, memory, mental flexibility, verbal ability, speed of response in a cognitive task, and speed in executing structured tasks. A review of studies in 2018 reports a relationship between people in chronic pain and abnormal results in test of memory, attention, and processing speed.

Social and personal impacts

Social support
Social support has important consequences for individuals with chronic pain. In particular, pain intensity, pain control, and resiliency to pain have been implicated as outcomes influenced by different levels and types of social support. Much of this research has focused on emotional, instrumental, tangible and informational social support. People with persistent pain conditions tend to rely on their social support as a coping mechanism and therefore have better outcomes when they are a part of larger more supportive social networks. Across a majority of studies investigated, there was a direct significant association between social activities or social support and pain. Higher levels of pain were associated with a decrease in social activities, lower levels of social support, and reduced social functioning.

Racial disparities
Evidence exists for unconscious biases and negative stereotyping against racial minorities requesting pain treatment, although clinical decision making was not affected, according to one 2017 review. Minorities may be denied diagnoses for pain and pain medications, and are more likely to go through substance abuse assessment, and are less likely to transfer for pain specialist referral. Preliminary research showed that health providers might have less empathy for black patients and underestimated their pain levels, resulting in treatment delays. Minorities may  experience a language barrier, limiting the high level of engagement between the person with pain and health providers for treatment.

Perceptions of injustice
Similar to the damaging effects seen with catastrophizing, perceived injustice is thought to contribute to the severity and duration of chronic pain. Pain-related injustice perception has been conceptualized as a cognitive appraisal reflecting the severity and irreparability of pain- or injury-related loss (e.g., "I just want my life back"), and externalizing blame and unfairness ("I am suffering because of someone else's negligence."). It has been suggested that understanding problems with top down processing/cognitive appraisals can be used to better understand and treat this problem.

Chronic pain and COVID-19
COVID-19 has disrupted the lives of many, leading to major physical, psychological and socioeconomic impacts in the general population. Social distancing practices defining the response to the pandemic alter familiar patterns of social interaction, creating the conditions for what some psychologists are describing as a period of collective grief. Individuals with chronic pain tend to embody an ambiguous status, at times expressing that their type of suffering places them between and outside of conventional medicine. With a large proportion of the global population enduring prolonged periods of social isolation and distress, one study found that people with chronic pain from COVID-19 experienced more empathy towards their suffering during the pandemic.

Effect of chronic pain in the workplace 
In the workplace, chronic pain conditions are a significant problem for both the person with the condition and the organization; a problem only expected to increase in many countries due to an aging workforce. In light of this, it may be helpful for organizations to consider the social environment of their workplace, and how it may be working to ease or worsen chronic pain issues for employees. As an example of how the social environment can affect chronic pain, some research has found that high levels of socially prescribed perfectionism (perfectionism induced by external pressure from others, such as a supervisor) can interact with the guilt felt by a person with chronic pain, thereby increasing job tension, and decreasing job satisfaction.

Mobility and road safety impacts

A 2022 systematic review found that chronic pain could increase crash risk among drivers. Chronic pain drivers report experiencing difficulties with safety maneuvers, such as shoulder checking for blind spots, merging with traffic, turning corners, and reversing the vehicle.

See also 
 Childhood chronic pain
 Neuroinflammation
 Neurodegeneration
 Dopaminergic pathways

References

Further reading

External links 
 
 
 International Association for the Study of Pain 

Chronic pain syndromes
Nociception
Pain management